Redcliffe is a suburb of Perth, Western Australia, located in the City of Belmont local government area.

The boundaries of the suburb are determined by the Great Eastern Highway, Tonkin Highway and Epsom Avenue, Belmont, and the grounds of the Perth International Airport which lie on the eastern edge of the suburb.

The story of its name is ambiguous: while some claim it was named after steep red clay deposits that lined the banks of the Swan River when settlers first arrived, others claim that it was named after the ancestral home of an early settler. The suburb was once a single property near modern-day Water Street and the main house, "Nulsen Haven" still stands today. The local primary school was built in 1908 and at this time, Redcliffe had been transformed from one property into many small farms after being subdivided in 1897.

Modern Redcliffe is a mix of residential, semi-industrial and retail buildings. It is 18 minutes from the Perth central business district and a short walk from the Swan River.

Transport 
Redcliffe was previously only served by Transperth bus routes 39 between its terminus on Grand Parade and Elizabeth Quay bus station, and the high frequency route 935 between Perth Airport and Kings Park via the Belmont Forum Shopping Centre and Perth City, along with several other routes operating along the Great Eastern Highway.

On the 9th of October 2022, the new Redcliffe railway station opened as part of the Airport line. The station provides a rail link to High Wycombe to the east via Perth Airport, and Claremont station to the west via Perth. It also resulted in changes for bus routes in the area. Route 935 was changed to terminate at Redcliffe Station instead of Perth Airport, while also operating a more direct route along Stanton Road instead of Johnson Street and Treffone Street. Route 39 was extended to operate to the railway station, serving the aforementioned streets instead of the 935. A new high frequency route, the 940, travels directly to the Perth CBD via the Great Eastern Highway along the north part of the suburb. Route 293 travels to High Wycombe railway station and provided a connection between Stanton Road and Great Eastern Highway via Epsom Avenue. Other services to the Redcliffe Train Station include the 290 and 291, which connect to Midland railway station, and the 292, which operates as a circular route to the Perth Airport Terminals 3 & 4 from Redcliffe Station to replace routes which previously travelled to the Airport such as the 935. This route is usually operated by buses equipped with luggage racks for passenger convenience.

References

 
Suburbs of Perth, Western Australia
Suburbs in the City of Belmont